Tom Snyders was an American comedian who bikes around the country,  commenting on road signs that he encounters.  He started in Las Vegas in 1983, and has traveled over 200,000 miles .  He's been on Good Morning America and Live with Regis and Kathie Lee.  He's also appeared on Comedy Central and ESPN.

References

External links
 Tom Snyders' web site
 obituary

American male comedians
21st-century American comedians
Living people
Year of birth missing (living people)